Forest is the first extended play by South Korean singer-actor Lee Seung-gi. It was released on 22 November 2012 by Hook Entertainment. The album was produced by Epitone Project (real name: Cha Se-jung) and contains five songs, including the single, "Return".

The album peaked at number three on the Gaon Album Chart, and sold over 23,000 copies by the end of 2012. "Return" topped the Gaon Digital Chart for three consecutive weeks and was the first song to spend six weeks in the number one spot on Billboard's K-pop Hot 100 chart.

Track listing

Charts

Weekly charts

Year-end charts

See also 

 Lee Seung-gi discography

References

2012 EPs
Lee Seung-gi albums
Kakao M EPs